The 2013 Touring Car Masters  was an Australian motor racing competition for modified Touring Cars manufactured between 1 January 1963 and 31 December 1976. It was sanctioned by the Confederation of Australian Motor Sport as a National Series with Australian Classic Touring (3D) Cars Pty Ltd appointed by CAMS as the Category Manager. It was the seventh annual Touring Car Masters series.

The series began on 9 March 2013 at Sydney Motorsport Park and finished on 24 November at Phillip Island. Six rounds were contested as support races to the 2013 International V8 Supercars Championship and rounds were also held at the Top Gear Festival and Muscle Car Masters events.

2010 winner Jim Richards won the series over defending winner John Bowe. Bowe won five of the eight rounds and eleven of the twenty-four races, compared to Richards' two race wins, but fell behind Richards after being excluded from the Sandown round for making contact with an official. Andrew Miedecke finished third in the series with two round and five race wins but his series aspirations were hurt by a points penalty for causing an accident at Bathurst. In Class B, 2007 outright series winner Steve Mason won from Greg Keene and William Vining.

Entries
The following drivers competed in the series:

† - John Bowe was excluded from taking part in the Sandown event after making contact with an official in the pit lane following a practice session. Stephen White replaced him for the rest of the event.

Calendar
The 2013 series consisted of eight rounds:

Points system
Each competing automobile was classified into one of two classes, Class A, Outright or Class B, Pro-Sportman.
 
Points are awarded as follows to the top thirty finishers in each class. 

Only half points were awarded for Race 1 of Round 7 at Mount Panorama due to the race being shortening on account of an accident.

The results for each round of the Series were determined by the number of points scored by each driver (including Guest Drivers) in each Class at that round.

Any points scored by a driver within a class were not transferred if that driver changed classes.

Series standings

References

 Race results sourced from National Software Online Race Results

Touring Car Masters
Touring Car Masters